Frank C. Hill III (born February 19, 1954, in El Paso, Texas) is a former American politician and convicted felon. A Republican, he served in the California State Assembly and California State Senate between the years of 1982 and 1994, where he represented Whittier, California.

In 1994, Hill was convicted of taking $2,500 from an undercover FBI agent for help with legislation in what was part of the BRISPEC sting operation. The conviction resulted in a 4 year  prison sentence.

In August 2020, Hill was served a search warrant and his home in Whittier was raided in connection with a corruption probe into a failed solar project that cost the City of Industry $20 million and left taxpayers with nothing to show for. Hill and three others were charged in September 2021 by Los Angeles County prosecutors as a result of the probe.

References

External links
Join California Frank Hill

Living people
Politicians from El Paso, Texas
People from Whittier, California
Republican Party members of the California State Assembly
1954 births
20th-century American politicians
Republican Party California state senators
California politicians convicted of crimes